Wherever I Go may refer to:

 "Wherever I Go" (Hannah Montana), the 2011 series finale of Hannah Montana
 "Wherever I Go" (Dan Bremnes song), 2018
 "Wherever I Go" (OneRepublic song), a 2016 single by OneRepublic
 "Wherever I Go", a song by Mark Knopfler from Tracker, 2015
 "Wherever I Go", a song by Miley Cyrus from Hannah Montana Forever, 2010
 "Wherever I Go", a song by Steve Earle from Transcendental Blues, 2000